Mukul Dagar (born 17 December 1990) is a cricketer who plays for Uttar Pradesh in Indian domestic cricket. Dagar is a left-hand opening batsman who has also played for India Under-19 cricket team.

He made his first-class debut against Karnataka in December 2011 at Shimoga, scoring 37.

References

External links 

Indian cricketers
Uttar Pradesh cricketers
Haryana cricketers
1990 births
Living people